Lance John Hamilton (born 5 April 1973) is a New Zealand cricketer.

He made his ODI debut in the 2005 series against Australia from 1 to 5 March 2005.

1973 births
Living people
New Zealand cricketers
New Zealand One Day International cricketers
Central Districts cricketers
People from Papakura